Ratliff City is a town in Carter County, Oklahoma, United States. The population was 120 at the 2010 census. Ratliff City was named for Ollie Ratliff, owner of a local garage. It is part of the Ardmore, Oklahoma Micropolitan Statistical Area.

History
The post office was opened on January 1, 1953, when the town was incorporated.

Geography
Ratliff City is located in northwestern Carter County at  (34.448918, -97.510999).

Ratliff City is located at the junction of State Highways 7 and 76. Highway 7 leads east  to Davis and west  to Duncan, while Highway 76 leads north  to Foster and south  to Healdton.

Demographics

As of the census of 2000, there were 131 people, 53 households, and 41 families residing in the town. There were 70 housing units at an average density of 62.3 per square mile (24.1/km2). The racial makeup of the town was 87.79% White, 1.53% African American, 5.34% Native American, and 5.34% from two or more races.

There were 53 households, out of which 32.1% had children under the age of 18 living with them, 62.3% were married couples living together, 13.2% had a female householder with no husband present, and 20.8% were non-families. 17.0% of all households were made up of individuals, and 13.2% had someone living alone who was 65 years of age or older. The average household size was 2.47 and the average family size was 2.74.

In the town, the population was spread out, with 25.2% under the age of 18, 3.8% from 18 to 24, 26.7% from 25 to 44, 27.5% from 45 to 64, and 16.8% who were 65 years of age or older. The median age was 41 years. For every 100 females, there were 79.5 males. For every 100 females age 18 and over, there were 78.2 males.

The median income for a household in the town was $23,125, and the median income for a family was $27,917. Males had a median income of $37,083 versus $11,250 for females. The per capita income for the town was $11,080. There were 20.0% of families and 17.5% of the population living below the poverty line, including 27.6% of under eighteens and 25.0% of those over 64.

References

Further reading
 Shirk, George H.; Oklahoma Place Names; University of Oklahoma Press; Norman, Oklahoma; 1987: .

Towns in Carter County, Oklahoma
Towns in Oklahoma
Ardmore, Oklahoma micropolitan area